Franz Marszalek (born 2 August 1900 in Breslau, Schlesien, Germany (now Wrocław, Silesia, Poland); died 28 October 1975 in Cologne, Germany) was a German conductor and composer, who was a leading figure in operetta.  He began his studies in Wrocław, and moved to Berlin in 1933.  He conducted the Cologne Radio Orchestra from 1949 to 1965, with an emphasis on operetta music.  He was a longtime friend of the operetta composer Eduard Künneke, whose music he championed in concerts and in recordings with the Cologne Radio Orchestra and the Cologne Radio Symphony Orchestra.

External links
 Brief note in Dutch

1900 births
1975 deaths
Musicians from Wrocław
German male conductors (music)
Officers Crosses of the Order of Merit of the Federal Republic of Germany
People from the Province of Silesia
20th-century German conductors (music)
20th-century German male musicians